The Jejuí Guazú River is a river in northeast Paraguay. It is a tributary of the Paraguay River.

Course

The Jejuí Guazú River flows from the Canindeyú Department, crosses the San Pedro Department just south of the department capital of San Pedro de Ycuamandiyú to join the Paraguay River.

The upper basin of the Jejuí River is protected by the Mbaracayú Forest Nature Reserve.

See also
List of rivers of Paraguay

References

Rivers of Paraguay